A wheelchair trainer or wheelchair treadmill is an apparatus that allows a manual wheelchair user to simulate linear (translational) travel while remaining stationary in a manner similar to an ambulatory person walking or running on a treadmill or a cyclist pedaling a bicycle on a bicycle trainer. The rear wheelchair wheels are placed in contact with vertical or horizontal rollers which may also be attached to flywheels, mechanical resistance or braking mechanisms, motors and various speed and force sensors. Flywheels may be sized to provide a user of a certain mass with a rotational inertia equivalent to their translational (linear) inertia in order to more realistically approximate actual wheelchair propulsion.

Wheelchair trainers having independent contact rollers permit simulated directional travel (omnidirectional treadmill). Trainers may also incorporate rotary encoders, accelerometers and torque sensors to enable  interface with computer data acquisition systems (DAQ) for analysis of propulsion kinematics. A quadrature rotary encoder or hall effect sensor can be implemented to provide sufficient speed and direction information to enable virtual navigation interface with video games in a manner similar to using a joystick or gaming console. Calculation of rolling resistance between the tire & contact roller interface, axle friction, and inertial characteristics of wheelchair wheels and flywheels may be used in determination of stationary propulsion dynamics.[dynamics]

History
The United States Department of Veterans Affairs (VA) has substantially invested in decades long research and development for two wheelchair trainer devices: the Wheelchair Aerobic Fitness Trainer (WAFT), and GameWheels. The history of wheelchair trainer development may be summarized from the 10 patents issued by the United States Patent and Trademark Office for stationary wheelchair trainers/treadmills/ergometers/dynamometer/simulators issued from 1980 to 2009.

Development
The last patent is being commercialized under the trademark Trekease, designed to serve as an acronym for Translational & Rotational Equivalent Kinetic Energy Aerobic Stationary Exertainment and as a homonym for Trekkies – fans of Star Trek. None of the other cited patents, including the experimental prototypes developed by the VA, are currently being commercialized; however simple unidirectional ramp and roller systems similar in design to patent #4,966,362 are being marketed by others. (See also External links).

Arcade game software and clinical data acquisition use were first introduced by the Veterans Administration's WAFT as a means of promoting stationary wheelchair propulsion as a beneficial aerobic exercise. Clinical professionals are not currently in agreement regarding the cardiovascular health benefits associated with manual wheelchair propulsion and the possible long term repetitive use injuries attributed to manual wheelchair operation.[aerobics] These debates have encouraged developments to enhance wheelchair seating, back support, frame, wheel, and hand-rim designs. Innovative lever styled mechanisms add a new level to improve the overall efficiency, posture and ergonomics of manual wheelchair propulsion.[ergonomics] Utilizing lever propulsion technologies on a wheelchair trainer equipped with flywheel and resistance enables one to engage in an activity similar to rowing with all its associated health benefits and risks.

References

Dynamics:
 .
 .
 .
 .
 .
 .
Aerobics:
 .
 .
 Shivayogi
 Hiremath
 .
 .
 .
 .

Ergonomics:
 
 .
 .
 .
 
 

Citations

 
 
 
 
 
 
 
 
 
 
 
 
 
 
 
 
 
 
 

Conferences

 
 

Web pages

External links
 Wheelchair trainer roller system designed and manufactured in the UK
 Typical US made ramp and roller wheelchair trainer with frictional resistance and without directionality
 British made low profile ramp & roller trainer with frictional resistance and without directionality
 High end motorized French made research wheelchair trainer/ergometer with directionality and camber adjustment

Exercise equipment
Chairs
Wheelchairs